Congregational prayer may refer to:

Prayer said collectively by a church congregation
Salah al jama'ah in Islam.

See also 
Congressional prayer (disambiguation)